Acriopsis, commonly known as chandelier orchids or 合萼兰属 (he e lan shu) is a genus of flowering plants in the family Orchidaceaes. Orchids in this genus are epiphytic herbs with spherical or cylindrical pseudobulbs, creeping, branched rhizomes, thin white roots, two or three leaves and many small flowers. The flowers are non-resupinate with the lateral sepals joined along their edges and have spreading petals and a three-lobed labellum. The column has projections that extend hood-like beyond the anther.

The genus was first formally described in 1825 by Carl Ludwig Blume who published the description in Bijdragen tot de flora van Nederlandsch Indië. The name Acriopsis is derived from the Ancient Greek words akris meaning "locust" or "grasshopper" and opsis, meaning "having the appearance of" or "like", referring to the grasshopper-like shape of the column."

Orchids in the genus Acriopsis are found in India, Yunnan, Southeast Asia, New Guinea, Melanesia, Micronesia and Queensland. They grow mainly in low, humid rainforests, sometimes ascending to medium altitudes. Their roots have specialised roots which grow from them up through the air and make branches which feed on litter and other debris.

Species
The following is a list of Acriopsis species accepted by the World Checklist of Selected Plant Families (WCSPF) as at January 2019:
Acriopsis carrii Holttum - Kelantan
Acriopsis densiflora Lindl.
Acriopsis densiflora var. borneensis (Ridl.) Minderh. & de Vogel - Borneo
Acriopsis densiflora var. densiflora - Borneo, Sumatra, Peninsular Malaysia
Acriopsis emarginata D.L.Jones & M.A.Clem. - Queensland
Acriopsis floribunda Ames
Acriopsis gracilis Minderh. & de Vogel - Sabah
Acriopsis indica C.Wright - Yunnan, Assam, Andaman Islands, Cambodia, Laos, Myanmar, Thailand, Vietnam, Borneo, Java, Lesser Sunda Islands, Malaysia, Philippines, Sulawesi
Acriopsis inopinata Phoon & P.O'Byrne - Peninsular Malaysia
Acriopsis latifolia Rolfe - Peninsular Malaysia
Acriopsis liliifolia (J.Koenig) Seidenf.
Acriopsis liliifolia var. auriculata (Minderh. & de Vogel) J.J.Wood - Myanmar, Vietnam, Borneo, Java, Sumatra, Peninsular Malaysia
Acriopsis liliifolia var. liliifolia - Assam, Sikkim, Andaman Islands, Myanmar, Cambodia, Laos, Malaysia, Thailand, Vietnam, Borneo, Java, Malaysia, Maluku, Lesser Sunda Islands, Sumatra, Sulawesi, Philippines, New Guinea, Solomon Islands, Queensland, Caroline Islands
Acriopsis ridleyi Hook.f. - Borneo, Malaysia

Acriopsis javanica is listed as a synonym of Acriopsis liliifolia var. lillifolia at WCSPF but is accepted by the Australian Plant Census''.

References

External links 

Cymbidiinae genera
Taxa named by Carl Ludwig Blume
Cymbidiinae